Pitty can refer to:
IWL Pitty, an East German 1950s motor scooter
Joseph Pitty Couthouy (1808–64), a United States Navy officer
Priscilla Novaes Leone (born 1977), a Brazilian singer whose stage name is Pitty
Pitty Und Ihre Beatchicks, singer on Decca  Germany, "Teenage Love" 1965
Pitty (footballer) (born 1987), Luiz Paulo Daniel Barbosa, Brazilian footballer